Confessions of an English Opium-Eater (1821) is an autobiographical account written by Thomas De Quincey, about his laudanum  addiction and its effect on his life. The Confessions was "the first major work De Quincey published and the one that won him fame almost overnight".

First published anonymously in September and October 1821 in the London Magazine, the Confessions was released in book form in 1822, and again in 1856, in an edition revised by De Quincey.

Synopsis
As originally published, De Quincey's account was organised into two parts:
 Part I begins with a notice "To the Reader", to establish the narrative frame: "I here present you, courteous reader, with the record of a remarkable period in my life...." It is followed by the substance of Part I,
 Preliminary Confessions, devoted to the author's childhood and youth, and concentrated upon the emotional and psychological factors that underlay the later opium experiences—especially the period in his late teens that De Quincey spent as a homeless runaway in Oxford Street in London in 1802 and 1803.
 Part II is split into several sections:
 A relatively brief introduction and connecting passage, followed by
 The Pleasures of Opium, which discusses the early and largely positive phase of the author's experience with the drug, from 1804 until 1812;
 Introduction to the Pains of Opium, which delivers a second instalment of autobiography, taking De Quincey from youth to maturity; and
 The Pains of Opium, which recounts the extreme of the author's opium experience (up to that time), with insomnia, nightmares, frightening visions, and difficult physical symptoms.
 Another "Notice to the Reader" attempts to clarify the chronology of the whole.

Though De Quincey was later criticised for giving too much attention to the pleasure of opium and not enough to the harsh negatives of addiction, The Pains of Opium is in fact significantly longer than The Pleasures. However, even when trying to convey darker truths, De Quincey's language can seem seduced by the compelling nature of the opium experience:

Style

From its first appearance, the literary style of the Confessions attracted attention and comment. De Quincey was well read in the English literature of the sixteenth and seventeenth centuries and assimilated influences and models from Sir Thomas Browne and other writers. Arguably the most famous and often-quoted passage in the Confessions is the apostrophe to opium in the final paragraph of The Pleasures:

De Quincey modelled this passage on the apostrophe "O eloquent, just and mightie Death!" in Sir Walter Raleigh's History of the World.

Earlier in The Pleasures of Opium De Quincey describes the long walks he took through the London streets under the influence of the drug:

The Confessions represents De Quincey's initial effort to write what he called "impassioned prose", an effort that he would later resume in Suspiria de Profundis (1845) and The English Mail-Coach (1849).

1856 revision
In the early 1850s, De Quincey prepared the first collected edition of his works for publisher James Hogg. For that edition, he undertook a large-scale revision of the Confessions, more than doubling the work's length. Most notably, he expanded the opening section on his personal background, until it consumed more than two-thirds of the whole. Yet he gave the book "a much weaker beginning" and detracted from the impact of the original with digressions and inconsistencies; "the verdict of most critics is that the earlier version is artistically superior".

"De Quincey undoubtedly spoiled his masterpiece by revising it... anyone who compares the two will prefer the unflagging vigour and tension of the original version to the tired prosiness of much of the revised one".

Influence

The Confessions maintained a place of primacy in De Quincey's literary output, and his literary reputation, from its first publication; "it went through countless editions, with only occasional intervals of a few years, and was often translated. Since there was little systematic study of narcotics until long after his death, De Quincey's account assumed an authoritative status and actually dominated the scientific and public views of the effects of opium for several generations."

Yet from the time of its publication, De Quincey's Confessions was criticized for presenting a picture of the opium experience that was too positive and too enticing to readers. As early as 1823, an anonymous response, Advice to Opium Eaters, was published "to warn others from copying De Quincey." The fear of reckless imitation was not groundless: several English writers—Francis Thompson, James Thomson, William Blair, and perhaps Branwell Brontë—were led to opium use and addiction by De Quincey's literary example. Charles Baudelaire's 1860 translation and adaptation, Les paradis artificiels, spread the work's influence further. One of the characters of the Sherlock Holmes story "The Man with the Twisted Lip" (1891) is an opium addict who began experimenting with the drug as a student after reading the Confessions. De Quincey attempted to address this type of criticism. When the 1821 original was printed in book form the following year, he added an Appendix on the withdrawal process; and he inserted significant material on the medical aspects of opium into his 1856 revision.

More generally, De Quincey's Confessions influenced psychology and abnormal psychology, and attitudes towards dreams and imaginative literature. Edgar Allan Poe praised Confessions for its "glorious imagination—deep philosophy—acute speculation".

The play The Opium Eater by Andrew Dallmeyer was based on Confessions of an English Opium-Eater, and has been published by Capercaillie Books. In 1962, Vincent Price starred in the full-length film Confessions of an Opium Eater, which was a reimagining of De Quincey's Confessions by Hollywood producer Albert Zugsmith.

In the 1999 documentary Tripping, recounting Ken Kesey's Furthur bus and its influence, Malcolm McLaren refers to De Quincey's book as the influence for the beatnik generation before Jack Kerouac's popular On the Road was written.

The book has been parodied in the Elder Scrolls series with the book Confessions of a Dunmer Skooma Eater, which first appeared in The Elder Scrolls III: Morrowind.

References

External links 

 
  (plain text and HTML)
Confessions of an English Opium-Eater, London Magazine, Vol. IV, (September 1821) No. xxi, pp. 293–312, and (October 1821) No. xxii, pp. 353–379.
Confessions of an English Opium-Eater at Internet Archive (scanned books original editions)
 

1821 documents
Literary autobiographies
Works published anonymously
Works originally published in The London Magazine
History of mental health in the United Kingdom
Opium in the United Kingdom
Books about mental health
Works about opium
Memoirs about drugs
1822 non-fiction books
Works by Thomas De Quincey
Autobiographies adapted into films